Yunmenglong (meaning "Yunmeng dragon", after the Yunmengshan area where it was found) is an extinct genus of somphospondylan sauropod known from the late Early Cretaceous of Henan Province, central China. Its remains were discovered in the Haoling Formation of the Ruyang Basin. The type species is Yunmenglong ruyangensis, described in 2013 by Junchang Lü et al. on the basis of an incomplete postcranial skeleton. Yunmenglong shares some characters with Euhelopus, Qiaowanlong and Erketu, and a phylogenetic analysis places it as a sister taxon of Qiaowanlong, both grouped with Erketu in a position more derived than Euhelopus but basal to Titanosauria.

Size 
Yunmenglong was a giant sauropod dinosaur, as evidenced by the complete right femur 192 cm long and 65 cm in distal width, which is comparable to other giant Chinese genus Fusuisaurus. In 2016 Paul estimated it at 20 meters (65.6 ft) and 30 tonnes (33 short tons). In 2020 Molina-Pérez and Larramendi gave a larger length of 27 meters (88.6 ft) and a similar weight of 29 tonnes (32 short tons).

References

Early Cretaceous dinosaurs of Asia
Fossil taxa described in 2013
Macronarians
Paleontology in Henan
Taxa named by Lü Junchang